The Tête du Portail (2,335 m) is a mountain located at the western extremity of the Bernese Alps, in the Swiss canton of Valais. It lies north of Martigny and Fully, in the Dent de Morcles-Grand Muveran group.

The mountain is named after a natural arch, the Portail de Fully, located near the summit at a height of 2,270 metres.

References

External links
 Tête du Portail on Hikr

Mountains of the Alps
Mountains of Switzerland
Mountains of Valais
Two-thousanders of Switzerland